Steven Woodburn (born 24 October 1963) is a French ice hockey player. He competed in the men's tournaments at the 1988 Winter Olympics and the 1994 Winter Olympics.

References

External links

1963 births
Living people
Olympic ice hockey players of France
Ice hockey players at the 1988 Winter Olympics
Ice hockey players at the 1994 Winter Olympics
Ice hockey people from Montreal
Shawinigan Cataractes players
Verdun Juniors players
Laval Voisins players
Edmonton Oilers draft picks
Rouen HE 76 players
Phoenix Mustangs players